Janakpuri is a suburb in the Southwest Delhi district of Delhi, India.

Janakpuri may also refer to:
 Janakpuri West metro station, an interchange station between the Blue Line and Magenta Line of the Delhi Metro
 Janakpuri (Delhi Assembly constituency), one of the 70 Vidhan Sabha constituencies of the National Capital Territory in northern India
 Janakpuri East metro station, located on the Blue Line of the Delhi Metro

See also 
 Janakpur (disambiguation)